The national symbols of Saint Lucia are the symbols that this Caribbean nation identifies with. The most recognizable national symbols of Saint Lucia are the flag and the coat of arms.

Flag of St. Lucia 

The national flag of Saint Lucia was adopted on March 1, 1967, upon achieving self-government. The flag was designed by Dunstan St. Omer. The government of St. Lucia gives the following description of the flag:

The blue colour represent fidelity. It reflects the tropical sky and also the emerald surrounding waters of the Caribbean Sea and the Atlantic Ocean. The gold represents the prevailing sunshine in the Caribbean and prosperity. The triangles represent the mountains in St. Lucia. The Triangle, the shape of which is the partition isosceles triangle, is reminiscent of the island’s famous twin Pitons at Soufriere, rising sheer out of the sea, towards the sky -themselves, a symbol of the hope and aspirations of the people.

Coat of arms 

The coat of arms of Saint Lucia was designed by Sydney Bagshaw in 1967. The coat of arms is made of a blue shield with a stool, two roses and two fleur de lis. The shield is supported by two Saint Lucian parrots. Beneath the shield is the national motto, where as above the shield there is al torch and on ornament. The symbolism of the elements are:

Tudor rose - England
Fleur de lis - st.lucia
Stool - Africa
Torch - Beacon to light the path
Saint Lucia parrot - Amazona versicolor, the national bird
 Motto: "The land, the people, the light"

Anthem 

The national anthem of Saint Lucia is Sons and Daughters of Saint Lucia. The anthem was first adopted in 1967 upon achieving self-government, and confirmed as the official anthem upon independence in 1979.
The lyrics were written by Rev.Charles Jesse, and the music by Mr.Leton Thomas

Saint Lucian parrot 

The Saint Lucia amazon (also known as the Saint Lucia parrot) (Amazona versicolor) is a species of parrot in the family Psittacidae. It is endemic to Saint Lucia and is the country's national bird.

It was first described by Miller in 1776, this beautiful parrot is, and always has been found only in Saint Lucia. It is predominantly green in colour, and a typical specimen has a cobalt blue forehead merging through turquoise to green on the cheeks and a scarlet breast.

There are no visible differences between the two sexes. Mating for life and maturing after five years, these long-lived birds are cavity nesters, laying two to three white eggs in the hollow of a large tree during the onset of the dry season between February and April. Incubation commences on the appearance of the second egg and lasts 27 days. The young fledge leave the nest 67 days after hatching.

Today the parrot, and most other forms of wildlife are absolutely protected in the country, because Saint Lucia’s national bird remains an endangered species.

National clothing 
According to the government of Saint Lucia the national dress are the Wob Dwiyet and the Madras.

The Wob Dwiyrt consists of the following:
	
A long petticoat made of cotton or satin and decorated with rows of lace and ribbon.
The Dwiyet – A full-length outer dress with a trail and narrow sleeves that extend to the wrists.
A Foulard – A scarf worn around the neck and shoulders with a triangular apex at the centre of the back and attached to the Dwiyet at the front with a brooch. This scarf is made of satin and is usually of a colour that contrasts with that of the dress.
The Tete Casé – A folded head piece which is decorated to suit the taste or status of the wearer.

In addition, wearers of the Wob Dwiyet adorn themselves with a substantial amount of jewellery including long necklaces and large earrings. The Wob Dwiyet is a style of ladies' dress which began appearing in the French West Indies towards the end of the 18th century. Its design is believed to have originated from Southern France, where women at the time wore a similar outfit.

National flower, plant, and tree 

The rose and the marguerite are the symbols of the two flower societies of Saint Lucia.  They emerged as winners of the National Flower Competition in September 1985.

The national tree of Saint Lucia is calabash, where as the national plant is bamboo.

See also 
 Saint Lucia
 Flag of Saint Lucia
 Coat of arms of Saint Lucia
 National anthem of Saint Lucia

References

External links 
  Code of Etiquette for the use of the National Flag of Saint Lucia
  Protocol for the National Anthem of Saint Lucia
  Coat of Arms of Saint Lucia
 Biographies available in The Designers (Saint Lucia National Symbols)